The 2007–08 TFF Second League season.

Promotion Group

Table

Results

Classification Group 1

Table

Results

Classification Group 2

Table

Results

Classification Group 3

Table

Results

Classification Group 4

Table

Results

Classification Group 5

Table

Results

Play-off games

Quarter-finals

Semi-final

Final

References

TFF Second League seasons
3
Turkey